Serhiy Mykolaiovych Mazur (born 23 May 1970) is a former Ukrainian football midfielder and football manager. Currently he is a vice-president of FC Kryvbas Kryvyi Rih (2020) in the Ukrainian Second League.

Career
He started his football career in the Soviet Union, played for FC Shakhtar Donetsk reserves in 1987 debuting for senior squad in 1990. Having difficult time to make the senior squad, in 1991 Mazur left for FC Kryvbas Kryvyi Rih that played in the Soviet Lower Second League (Ukrainian championship). Following dissolution of the Soviet Union, he played in the very first championship of Ukraine and as a player of Kryvbas was promoted to the Vyshcha Liha (better known as Ukrainian Premier League). In 1994 Mazur joined a team from Zhovti Vody for which he played until it went bankrupt. Later for a half a season Mazur played for a team from Carpathian region, but soon return to Kryvbas again. In 1996 he left Ukraine and played abroad in Russia and Kazakhstan.

After retirement in early 2000s, Mazur returned to Kryvbas where he was appointed as a senior coach of its youth team. After Kryvbas went bankrupt, he stayed with the team and in 2015 was appointed as its head coach competing at the Dnipropetrovsk Oblast championship. In fall of 2011 Mazur survived a mass heart attack.

He is a brother of another professional footballer Vasyl Mazur.

References

External links

1970 births
Living people
Ukrainian footballers
Soviet footballers
Ukrainian football managers
FC Shakhtar Donetsk players
FC Kryvbas Kryvyi Rih players
FC Zorya Luhansk players
FC Sirius Kryvyi Rih players
FC Hoverla Uzhhorod players
FC Spartak Ryazan players
FC Kyzylzhar players
FC Irtysh Pavlodar players
Ukrainian expatriate footballers
Expatriate footballers in Russia
Expatriate footballers in Kazakhstan
FC Kryvbas Kryvyi Rih managers
Association football midfielders
Twin sportspeople
Sportspeople from Donetsk Oblast